V. S. Pargaonkar (Devanagari: वि. शं. पारगावकर) was a Marathi writer from Maharashtra, India.

He wrote twenty-five books, including novels and collections of his short stories, critiques, and essays.

Authorship
The following is a partial list of Pargaonkar's books:

Novels:

 कालचक्र
 अंतरिता
 एक होता राजा
 अयोनिजा
 निगुडा

Collections of short stories:
 उजळती लकेर
 आविष्कार

Collection of essays:
 सय

Pargaonkar, V. S.